The Polish Space Agency (POLSA; Polish: Polska Agencja Kosmiczna, PAK) is the space agency of Poland, administered by the Ministry of Development, Labour and Technology. It is a member of the European Space Agency. The agency is focused on developing satellite networks and space technologies in Poland. It was established on 26 September 2014, and its headquarters are located in Gdańsk, Poland.

History 
The Agency was established under the Act of September 26, 2014, and started operating with a full team at the end of 2015. The Polish Space Agency, as a government executive agency, participates in the implementation of Poland's strategic goals, taking actions to increase the use of satellite systems and accelerate development of space technologies for the benefit of national administration, science, economy and defence.

In November 2014, professor Marek Banaszkiewicz, who previously served as director of the Space Research Center of the Polish Academy of Sciences became the first President of the newly formed agency. The vice-president for science became professor Marek Moszyński from the Faculty of Electronics, Telecommunications and Information Technology of the Gdańsk University of Technology, and the Vice-President for Defense - General Lech Majewski.

Management 
 President: Grzegorz Wrochna (from 18 February 2021)
 Vice-President: Col. Marcin Mazur (since 22 November 2021)
 Vice-President: Michał Wierciński, PhD (since 25 February 2022)

References 

Space agencies
European Space Agency
Scientific organisations based in Poland
Organizations established in 2014
2014 establishments in Poland
European space programmes